Mieczysław Franciszek Rakowski (1 December 1926 – 8 November 2008) was a Polish communist politician, historian and journalist who was Prime Minister of Poland from 1988 to 1989. He served as the seventh and final First Secretary of the Polish United Workers' Party from 1989 to 1990.

Career
Rakowski was born in a peasant family, operated a lathe as a teenager. He served as an officer in the Polish People's Army from 1945 to 1949. He began his political career in 1946 as a member of the Polish Workers' Party, and from 1948 to 1990 he was a member of the communist Polish United Workers' Party (PZPR), serving on its Central Committee from 1975 to 1990.

He received a doctorate in history from Warsaw's Institute for Social Sciences in 1956. Rakowski served as the second-to-last communist Prime Minister of Poland from September 1988 to August 1989 (Czesław Kiszczak then served less than a month as the last Communist to hold the post, before the accession of Tadeusz Mazowiecki).  He was the last First Secretary of the PZPR from July 1989 to January 1990.  However, he was not, unlike his predecessors, the de facto leader of the country; the PZPR had given up its monopoly on power in early 1989.

Rakowski was also known as one of the founders and, from 1958 to 1982, first deputy and then chief editor of the weekly newspaper Polityka, one of the most influential publications at the time (Polityka continues to exist and is regarded by many as the most prestigious weekly in Poland). Today some people still remember him as a journalist and editor rather than a politician.

Rakowski was involved in the Communist government during suppression of the Solidarity movement. 
He also played a part in the Polish transformation from state socialism to market capitalism, as his Communist-led government was forced to reform and he was one of the key players in the Polish Round Table Agreements.

Prior to becoming Prime Minister, he had been divorced from the violinist Wanda Wiłkomirska, with whom he had two sons.

He died on 8 November 2008 from cancer in Warsaw at the age of 81. He was buried at the Powązki Military Cemetery in Warsaw.

References

External links
 Gallery of photos
 Memories about Rakowski (Gazeta Wyborcza)
 Obituary of Rakowski in The Economist

1926 births
2008 deaths
People from Kcynia
People from Poznań Voivodeship (1921–1939)
Polish Workers' Party politicians
Members of the Politburo of the Polish United Workers' Party
Prime Ministers of the Polish People's Republic
Members of the Polish Sejm 1972–1976
Members of the Polish Sejm 1976–1980
Members of the Polish Sejm 1980–1985
Members of the Polish Sejm 1985–1989
20th-century Polish historians
Polish male non-fiction writers
20th-century Polish journalists
Burials at Powązki Military Cemetery